Penicillaria lineatrix is a moth of the family Noctuidae first described by Francis Walker in 1858. It is found in India and Sri Lanka.

Male antennae bipectinate (comb like on both sides). Forewings with an obtuse marginal central angle. Hindwings basally white with broad border.

References

Moths of Asia
Moths described in 1858
Euteliinae